People's Democracy may refer to:

 People's democracy (Marxism–Leninism), an ideological concept conceived by communist parties in the aftermath of World War II
 People's Democracy (Ireland), a defunct political party in Northern Ireland
 People's Democracy (newspaper), weekly publication of the Communist Party of India (Marxist)
 People's Multiparty Democracy, the ideological line of the Nepal Communist Party

See also 
 People's republic